The discography of the Christian Rock  band Pillar, which consists of 9 studio albums, 3 EPs, and 24 singles.

Studio albums

Extended plays

Singles

References

Discography
Christian music discographies
Discographies of American artists